Francis Douglas may refer to:
Francis Douglas (priest) (1910–1943), missionary in the Philippines
Francis Douglas, 8th Earl of Wemyss (1772–1853), Scottish peer
Lord Francis Douglas (1847–1865), son of Archibald Douglas, 8th Marquess of Queensberry who was killed in the first successful ascent of the Matterhorn
Francis Douglas, Viscount Drumlanrig (1867–1894), Scottish nobleman and politician
Francis Douglas, 1st Baron Douglas of Barloch (1889–1980), MP from Battersea North and Governor of Malta
Francis Brown Douglas (1814–1885), Scottish advocate
Francis Douglas, 11th Marquess of Queensberry (1896–1954), Scottish soldier, stockbroker and author

See also
Frank L. Douglas, Guyanese American medical doctor
Francis Douglas Memorial College, a high school in New Plymouth, New Zealand